Jean-Claude Danglot (born 20 September 1950) is a member of the Senate of France, representing the Pas-de-Calais department. He is a member of the Communist, Republican, and Citizen Group. He succeeded Yves Coquelle, who resigned for reasons of health in 2007.

References
Page on the Senate website 

1950 births
Living people
French Senators of the Fifth Republic
Senators of Pas-de-Calais
Place of birth missing (living people)